Olga Govortsova was the defending champion, but she chose to participate in Acapulco instead.

Kristýna Plíšková won the title, defeating Amra Sadiković in the final, 7–6(7–4), 7–6(7–3).

Seeds

Main draw

Finals

Top half

Bottom half

References 
 Main draw

ITF Women's Circuit UBS Thurgau - Singles